Aspire Building, also known as the One Eleven Building, is a 31-story office and residential building overlooking Lake Eola in Orlando, Florida. The building was completed in 2008 at a cost of US$80 million and is owned by Lincoln Orlando Holdings.

Construction of the tower was announced in 2004. Dynetech Corporation had planned to occupy part of the building upon its completion and secured the naming rights as marquee tenant. By 2009, Dynetech Corporation was in bankruptcy and the building was renamed as the Aspire Building / One Eleven Building in 2013.

See also
List of tallest buildings in Orlando
The VUE at Lake Eola

References

External links

Skyscraper office buildings in Orlando, Florida
Skyscrapers in Orlando, Florida
Residential skyscrapers in Florida
Office buildings completed in 2008
Residential buildings completed in 2008
2008 establishments in Florida